FastCopy computer software is  a file and directory copier that runs under Microsoft Windows. It was originally open-source, under the GPLv3 license, but later freeware releases reported "Due to various circumstances, distribution of the source code is temporarily suspended".

There are 32- and 64-bit versions, which run under Windows 7 and later, and Windows Server 2012 and later. The total size of the executable and DLL files comprising 64-bit version 4.1.7 is  1.3MB. It can run as a free-standing portable application or be integrated into the Windows shell, and claims to achieve  reading and writing performance  close to the device limit.

In a test conducted in 2008 by lifehacker, Fastcopy was several times faster than its rival Teracopy, a program with similar functionality. However, both programs have been updated since then. A more extensive comparison was performed between TeraCopy v2.07beta, KillCopy v2.85, FastCopy v1.99r4, SuperCopier v2.2bet and published on a forum in 2009.

In Microsoft Windows prior to Windows 10 v1607, programs that use the Win32 API, such as Windows Explorer, do not support path names longer than 260 UTF-16 characters; later versions of Windows allow this to be changed via the registry or group policy. FastCopy does not use Microsoft's API and places its own calls to the NT kernel, allowing operations with path names longer than 260 characters.

In 2015 FastCopyV2.11 (BSD License) was ported to Mac OS X by Japanese PostProduction L'espace Vision. It is sold on the Mac App Store as "RapidCopy". In 2016 L'espace Vision released the Linux version of "RapidCopy for Linux" on GitHub under a BSD 2-Clause license.

Screenshots

Reception
Bogdan Popa, who reviewed FastCopy 3.92 in Softpedia, praised the product as being "An overall efficient and reliable file management tool" and gave it 4.5 out of 5 stars. User ratings by 419 users gave it an average of 4.2 out of 5 stars.

Ported versions
  macOS: RapidCopy
  Linux: RapidCopy for Linux

See also

 RichCopy
 Robocopy
 Teracopy
 Ultracopier

References

External links
 
 

Utilities for Windows